The Bridge of San Luis Rey (1929) is a film released by Metro-Goldwyn-Mayer in both silent and part-talkie versions. The film was directed by Charles Brabin and starred Lili Damita and Don Alvarado. Only the silent version exists at the George Eastman House film archive.

The film closely follows the bestselling 1927 Thornton Wilder novel of the same name and won the second Academy Award for Best Art Direction.

Background and production
The film and novel are very loosely based on the real-life story of Micaela Villegas (1748–1819), a famous Peruvian entertainer known as La Perichole. Her life was also the inspiration for the novella Le Carrosse du Saint-Sacrement by Prosper Mérimée; the opéra bouffe La Périchole  by Jacques Offenbach; and Jean Renoir’s 1953 film Le Carrosse d'or (The Golden Coach).

Remakes
The film was remade in 1944 with Lynn Bari, and once more in 2004, starring F. Murray Abraham, Gabriel Byrne, Robert De Niro, Kathy Bates, and Pilar López de Ayala.

Cast
Lili Damita as Camila (La Perichole) 
Ernest Torrence as Uncle Pio 
Raquel Torres as Pepita 
Don Alvarado as Manuel 
Duncan Renaldo as Esteban 
Henry B. Walthall as Father Juniper 
Michael Vavitch as Viceroy 
Emily Fitzroy as Marquesa 
Jane Winton as Doña Carla 
Gordon Thorpe as Jaime 
Mitchell Lewis as Capt. Alvarado 
Paul Ellis as Don Vicente 
Eugenie Besserer as A nun 
Tully Marshall as A townsman

References

External links

 
 
 
 The Bridge of San Luis Rey at SilentEra

1929 films
1920s historical drama films
American historical drama films
American silent feature films
American black-and-white films
Films based on American novels
Films directed by Charles Brabin
Films whose art director won the Best Art Direction Academy Award
Metro-Goldwyn-Mayer films
Transitional sound films
Films about bridges
1929 drama films
1920s American films
Silent American drama films